Arktika (literally: Arctic) is a retired nuclear-powered icebreaker of the Soviet (now Russian) Arktika class. In service from 1975 to 2008, she was the first surface ship to reach the North Pole, a feat achieved on August 17, 1977, during an expedition dedicated to the 60th anniversary of the October Revolution.

At the strongest point, the cast steel prow is ) thick and bow-shaped to aid in icebreaking, the curve applying greater dynamic force to fracture the ice than a straight bow would.

The ship is divided by eight bulkheads, providing nine watertight compartments, and can undergo short towing operations when needed. It also comes equipped with a helicopter pad and hangar at the aft of the ship. Mil Mi-2 "Hoplite", dubbed ptichka (Russian for "little bird"), or Kamov Ka-27 "Helix" helicopters are used for scouting expeditions to find safe routes through the ice floes.

Construction
Construction of the ship began in the Baltic Shipyard in Leningrad on July 3, 1971. Sea trials completed successfully on December 17, 1975. For further information on the ship's design, construction and propulsion system, see .

Renaming controversy
In 1982, she was rechristened Leonid Brezhnev in honour of Leonid Brezhnev, the General Secretary of the Central Committee of the Communist Party of the Soviet Union from 1964 until his death in 1982. In 1986 the name reverted to Arktika, according to some accounts because the ship's crew disliked the new name and refused to respond to radio messages unless the ship was referred to as Arktika. Within a week of the strike, the name was changed back. Another explanation is that the original name change had been due to an administrative mixup, and the name Leonid Brezhnev had never been supposed to apply to Arktika at all, but had been intended for a different ship.

Service history
The vessel was in service from 1975 to 2008.

Arktika was retired for several years, but was repaired in the late 1990s.

Originally designed for 100,000 hours of reactor life, Arktikas service life was prolonged another 50,000 hours in 2000, and another 25,000 hours after that, adding eight years to a 25-year planned service life. The life extension was accomplished by means of replacing critical equipment to allow the safe and continued operation of the nuclear plant. On May 17, 2000, a conference of Russian engineers, scientists, and government officials took place on board Arktika after her first service extension. The extension cost only $4 million, compared to the $30–50 million cost of a new nuclear icebreaker, and proved to be a successful endeavor. The conference therefore concluded that the lifetimes of Russian nuclear icebreakers could be successfully extended to 175,000 hours, and possibly more.

On April 9, 2007, a fire broke out on Arktika. The fire caused minor damage to three cabins and knocked out an electricity-distribution panel. The nuclear reactor was not damaged. There were no injuries. The icebreaker was in the Kara Sea when the blaze erupted, and was sent to Murmansk.

Withdrawal
After 33 years of reliable icebreaking, having become the first surface ship to reach the North Pole in 1977, and the first civilian ship to spend more than a year at sea without making port in 2000, and covering more than a million nautical miles by 2005, Arktika was retired in October 2008. In the meantime, she is a subject of important research, focused mainly on how to further extend the service life of the other Arktika-class icebreakers. There have been calls for the ship to be converted to a museum, either in Murmansk or St. Petersburg. An earlier Soviet nuclear icebreaker, Lenin, is already a museum ship in Murmansk.

Gallery

References

External links 
 

 

1972 ships
Icebreakers of Russia
Icebreakers of the Soviet Union
Nuclear-powered icebreakers
Ships built at the Baltic Shipyard
North Pole